Colman Jason Domingo (born November 28, 1969) is an American actor, writer, and director. Known for his cool and confident roles on stage and screen, Domingo has received various accolades including a Primetime Emmy Award and nominations for a Tony Award and Olivier Award.

Domingo's early Broadway roles include the 2005 play Well and the 2008 musical Passing Strange. He gained acclaim for his role as Mr. Bones in the Broadway musical The Scottsboro Boys (2011) for which he received a nomination for Tony Award for Best Featured Actor in a Musical. He reprised the role in the 2014 West End production receiving a Laurence Olivier Award for Best Performance in a Supporting Role in a Musical nomination. In 2018 he wrote the book for the Broadway musical Summer: The Donna Summer Musical.

After early roles in various incarnations of the Law & Order series, he received his breakthrough playing Victor Strand in the AMC series Fear the Walking Dead (2015–present). In 2022, he received the Primetime Emmy Award for Outstanding Guest Actor in a Drama Series for his performance as the recovering drug addict Ali on the HBO Max series Euphoria. 

Domingo's film appearances include supporting roles in Lincoln (2012), Selma (2014), If Beale Street Could Talk (2018), and Ma Rainey's Black Bottom (2020). For his role as a ruthless pimp in Janicza Bravo's Zola (2021) he received a Independent Spirit Award for Best Supporting Male nomination.

Early life and education
Domingo was born in Philadelphia, Pennsylvania. His father is from Belize and his family is from Guatemala. Domingo attended Overbrook High School and later Temple University, where he majored in journalism. Soon thereafter he moved to San Francisco, California, where he started acting, mainly in theatre productions.

Career
Domingo starred as Mr. Franklin Jones, Joop, and Mr. Venus, in the critically acclaimed rock musical Passing Strange, which, after a successful 2007 run at The Public Theater, opened on Broadway on February 28, 2008. He received an Obie Award in spring 2008 as part of the ensemble of Passing Strange Off-Broadway and reprised his roles in the film version of Passing Strange, directed by Spike Lee, which made its premiere at the Sundance Film Festival in January 2009. In 2010, Domingo's self-penned, one-man autobiographical play A Boy and His Soul premiered Off-Broadway at the Vineyard Theatre, for which he won a Lucille Lortel Award for Outstanding Solo Show. He was also nominated for a Drama Desk Award and a Drama League Award. Domingo starred as a replacement role as Billy Flynn in Chicago, the longest running revival on Broadway.

Domingo earned acclaim in the final collaboration by Kander and Ebb of The Scottsboro Boys, directed by Susan Stroman on Broadway in Fall 2010. For the latter role, he was nominated for the Tony Award for Best Featured Actor in a Musical in May 2011. When The Scottsboro Boys opened in London in Fall 2013, Domingo was nominated for the Laurence Olivier Award for Best Performance in a Supporting Role in a Musical in April 2014. He was nominated for the Fred Astaire Award for Best Principal Dancer on Broadway in 2011.

Domingo collaborated with Spike Lee appearing in his films Miracle at St. Anna (2008), and Red Hook Summer (2012). He appeared as Private Harold Green in Steven Spielberg's historical epic Lincoln (2012). The following year he appeared in the civil rights films such as a 42 (2013) playing Lawson Bowman and The Butler as Freddie Fallows. In 2014 he appeared in Ava DuVernay's civil rights film Selma portraying activist and Baptist minister Ralph Abernathy. In 2015, Domingo began appearing in a recurring role on AMC's post-apocalyptic, zombie series Fear the Walking Dead, as a character named Victor Strand. In December 2015, it was announced that Domingo was promoted to series regular for Season 2 of the series. That same year he had a recurring role as Dr. Russell Daniels in the Cinemax series The Knick. The following year he made appearances on Lucifer and Louis C.K.'s self-streaming show Horace and Pete.

In 2017, Domingo joined Academy of Motion Picture Arts and Sciences as a member of the Actors' Branch. In 2018, Domingo joined the Directors Guild of America as a director of episode 12 of season 4 of Fear The Walking Dead.  He is the first ever actor in The Walking Dead universe to helm an episode. In 2020, Domingo signed a first-look deal with AMC Networks.

In 2018 he appeared in Barry Jenkins' film adaptation of the James Baldwin 1974 novel of the same name If Beale Street Could Talk. In the film he plays Tish's father, Joseph Rivers. His on-screen wife is played by Regina King who received the Academy Award for Best Supporting Actress. That same year he collaborated with Sam Levinson acting in the black comedy film Assassination Nation playing Principal Turrell. The following year Levinson cast Domingo in a recurring role as Ali, a recovering drug addict in the HBO drama series Euphoria. 

In 2020 he received acclaim for his role as Cutler in the Netflix adaptation of August Wilson's play Ma Rainey's Black Bottom starring Viola Davis and Chadwick Boseman. He also received attention for his role as X, a ruthless pimp in the crime film Zola directed by Janicza Bravo. For his role as X he received a nomination for the Independent Spirit Award for Best Supporting Male. In 2022 he received the Primetime Emmy Award for Outstanding Guest Actor in a Drama Series for his role in Euphoria. 

Colman is set to star as civil rights activist Bayard Rustin in the Netflix film Rustin directed by George C. Wolfe. He is also set to appear as Mister in the movie musical adaptation of The Color Purple directed by Blitz the Ambassador. Both films are in post-production and are set to be released in 2023. 

 Teacher 
Domingo has taught at the O'Neill National Theater Institute, University of Texas at Austin, and University of Wisconsin at Madison.

Personal life
Domingo is openly gay and has been married to his husband, Raúl Domingo, since 2014.

Works
 As writer Up Jumped Springtime (Premiered at Theatre Rhinoceros in San Francisco, 1998)A Boy and His Soul (Premiered at the Vineyard Theatre in New York City, 2009; earlier version of the play premiered at the Thick Description Theater in San Francisco in 2005, and produced in 2008 as a part of Thick Description's 20th Anniversary Season; produced as a one night only performance at Joe's Pub in New York City in 2008; produced in Tricycle Theatre in London, UK in 2013; produced at Brisbane Powerhouse in Brisbane, Australia, in 2014)Wild With Happy (Premiered at The Public Theater in New York City in 2012; produced at TheatreWorks in Menlo Park, CA, in 2013; produced at Baltimore Center Stage in 2014; produced at City Theatre (Pittsburgh) in Pittsburgh, PA, in 2017Dot (Premiered at the Humana Festival of New American Plays in 2015; produced at the Vineyard Theatre in New York City in 2016; produced at Detroit Public Theatre in November 2016; produced at Everyman Theatre, Baltimore in December 2016; produced at New Venture Theatre in Baton Rouge, LA, in March 2017; produced at True Colors Theatre Company in Atlanta, GA, in April 2017; produced at St. Louis Black Repertory Theatre in St. Louis, MO, in September 2017; produced at PlayMakers Repertory Company in Chapel Hill, NC, in November 2017; produced at Park Square Theatre in St. Paul, MN, in November 2017; produced at The Billie Holiday Theatre in New York City in October 2018; produced at People's Light and Theatre Company in Malvern, PA in September 2019; produced at Soul Rep Theatre Company in Dallas, TX in December 2019)Summer: The Donna Summer Musical (book co-written with Robert Cary and Des McAnuff) (Premiered at La Jolla Playhouse in San Diego, CA, in November 2017; produced on Broadway at the Lunt-Fontanne Theatre with opening in Spring 2018)Lights Out: Nat "King" Cole (co-written with Patricia McGregor)  (Produced at People's Light and Theatre Company in Malvern, PA, in September 2017, it premiered on the West Coast in February 2019 at the Geffen Playhouse)West Philly, Baby'' (developed with Alisa Tager and AMC Networks/ALLBLK for television)

As director

Television

Stage

As actor

Film

Television

Stage

Awards and nominations

References

External links
 
 
 
 
 Interview with Colman Domingo, Words of Colour, July 25, 2013.

 'Fear the Walking Dead' Promotes Colman Domingo to Series Regular for Season 2 | Hollywood Reporter

1969 births
Living people
Male actors from Philadelphia
American male film actors
American male stage actors
American male television actors
American male voice actors
American gay actors
LGBT African Americans
African-American male actors
Primetime Emmy Award winners
20th-century American male actors
21st-century American male actors
Temple University alumni
Gay men
American people of Belizean descent
American people of Guatemalan descent
Hispanic and Latino American actors
LGBT Hispanic and Latino American people
20th-century African-American people
21st-century African-American people
21st-century LGBT people
LGBT people from Pennsylvania